In philology, a lapsus (Latin for "lapse, slip, error") is an involuntary mistake made while writing or speaking.

Investigations
In 1895 an investigation into verbal slips was undertaken by a philologist and a psychologist, Rudolf Meringer and Karl Mayer, who collected many examples and divided them into separate types.

Psychoanalysis
Freud was to become interested in such mistakes from 1897 onwards, developing an interpretation of slips in terms of their unconscious meaning. Subsequently followers of his like Ernest Jones developed the theme of lapsus in connection with writing, typing, and misprints.

According to Freud's early psychoanalytic theory, a lapsus represents a bungled act that hides an unconscious desire: “the phenomena can be traced back to incompletely suppressed psychical material...pushed away by consciousness”.

Jacques Lacan would thoroughly endorse the Freudian interpretation of unconscious motivation in the slip, arguing that “in the lapsus it is...clear that every unsuccessful act is a successful, not to say 'well-turned', discourse”.

In the seventies Sebastiano Timpanaro would controversially take up the question again, by offering a mechanistic explanation of all such slips, in opposition to Freud's theories.

Types of lapsus

In literature, a number of different types of lapsus are named depending on the mode of correspondence:
 lapsus linguae (pl. same): slip of the tongue 
 lapsus calami: slip of the pen With the variation of lapsus clavis: slip of the typewriter
 lapsus manus: slip of the hand, similar to lapsus calami
 lapsus memoriae: slip of memory

Types of slips of the tongue 
Slips of the tongue can happen on any level:
Syntactic - "is" instead of "was".
Phrasal slips of tongue - "I'll explain this tornado later".
Lexical/semantic - "moon full" instead of "full moon".
Morphological level - "workings paper".
Phonological (sound slips) - "flow snurries" instead of "snow flurries".

Additionally, each of these five levels of error may take various forms:
Anticipations: Where an early output item is corrupted by an element belonging to a later one, thus "reading list" - "leading list"
Perseverations or post-sonances: Where a later output item is corrupted by an element belonging to an earlier one Thus "waking rabbits" - "waking wabbits".
Deletions: Where an output element is somehow totally lost, thus "same state" - "same sate"
Shift or Spoonerism: Moving a letter, thus "black foxes" - "back floxes"
Haplologies or fusion: Half one word and half the other, thus "stummy" instead of "stomach or tummy"
Pun

Motivation
Meringer and Mayer highlighted the role of familiar associations and similarities of words and sounds in producing the lapsus. Freud objected that such factors did not cause but only "favour slips of the tongue...in the immense majority of cases my speech is not disturbed by the circumstance that the words I am using recall others with a similar sound...or that familiar associations branch off from them (emphasis copied from original)".

Timpanaro later reignited the debate, by maintaining that any given slip can always be explained mechanically without a need for deeper motivation.

J. L. Austin had independently seen slips not as revealing a particular complex, but as an ineluctable feature of the human condition, necessitating a continual preparation for excuses and remedial work.

See also

References

Further reading
 Sigmund Freud, The Psychopathology of Everyday Life (1965 [1901])
 Jonathan Goldberg, Writing Matter (1990)
 Sebastiano Timpanaro, The Freudian Slip (1976) (translation of Il lapsus freudiano: psicanalisi e critica testuale, 1974)
 John Austin, 'A Plea for Excuses', in Philosophical Papers (1961)

External links
 

Psychoanalytic terminology
Freudian psychology
Speech error